Hydractinia is a genus of commensal athecate hydroids which belong to the family Hydractiniidae. Hydractinia species mostly live on hermit-crabbed marine gastropod shells.

One species, Hydractinia echinata, is commonly known as snail fur. Another species, H. minoi, is known to be commensal with stingfishes of the genus Minous.

Species

References

Hydractinia at World Register of Marine Species

Hydractiniidae
Hydrozoan genera